Bacon's Laws were a series of reform measures that were passed in the colonial assembly of Virginia after Nathaniel Bacon invaded Jamestown on June 23, 1676, and had forced Governor William Berkeley and the Assembly to grant him a commission to fight the Indians.

References

Government of colonial Virginia